Tillandsia eizii is a species of flowering plant in the genus Tillandsia. This species is native to Mexico.

One of the physiological characteristics of Tillandsia eizii that is considered to be problematic include having low seed viability and germination.

References

[Wolf, J., Affolter, J., Wetzstein, H., Pickens, K., Affolter, J., & Wetzstein, H. (2006). Adventitious bud development and regeneration in Tillandsia eizii. In Vitro Cellular & Developmental Biology. Journal of the Tissue Culture Association., 42(4), 348–353. https://doi.org/10.1079/IVP2006779

eizii
Flora of Mexico